Eleonora Daniele (born 20 August 1976) is an Italian former actress and currently television presenter. She currently hosts the early morning program, Unomattina, on Rai Uno. She considers herself Roman Catholic.

References 

1976 births
Living people
Italian television personalities
Italian Roman Catholics